Balallan, meaning "Allan's Town", is a crofting township on the Isle of Lewis, in the Outer Hebrides, Scotland. Balallan is within the parish of Lochs.

The township has the distinction of being the longest village ( from end to end) in Lewis, and also in northern Scotland. Straggled along the head of a long sea loch between Arivruach and Laxay, it developed due to a mixture of crofting along the loch shore and fishing. It sits at the head of Loch Erisort.

Those on the loch side were each given direct access to the loch for their boats as well as access to the moorland behind for their sheep. They also attended to their croft, given relative shelter from the elements by the high ground to the west.

The village formerly had a police house, and currently houses a post office.

Just south of the village there is a cairn that stands as a memorial to the Deer Park Raiders. It is one of three Land Struggle cairns to have been commissioned on the Isle of Lewis.

References

External links

Canmore - Lewis, Balallan site record
Canmore - Lewis, Balallan, Carved Stone Ball site record

Villages in the Isle of Lewis